Camp Springs may refer to a location in the United States:

Camp Springs, Kentucky, an unincorporated community
Camp Springs House, a historic inn
Camp Springs, Maryland, a census-designated place
Camp Springs Army Base, original name for Andrews Air Force Base
Camp Springs, North Carolina, an unincorporated community